The Witch History Museum is located in Salem, Massachusetts and features dioramas and first person narrations, including little-known information about nineteen accused "witches" that were put to death in 1692. The museum covers the hysteria surrounding the events.

See also
Medical explanations of bewitchment
Salem Witchcraft Trials at Authentic Society

References

External links
Official website

History museums in Massachusetts
Salem witch trials
Museums in Salem, Massachusetts
Witchcraft museums